Nitro Pepsi is a cola soft drink produced by PepsiCo. It is a nitrogen-infused version of Pepsi. The addition of nitrogen gas, instead of the usual carbon dioxide, creates a smooth texture. It was developed around 2019, and has been marketed since March 2022. The drink comes in an aluminum can containing a widget that infuses the drink with nitrogen when the can is opened, similar to some nitrogen canned draft beers like Guinness. The beverage is also available in a vanilla flavor.

Critical review
BuzzFeed said the beverage tasted extremely sweet due to the lack of bitterness imparted by carbon dioxide. Paste magazine also noted the sweetness and said it was "super creamy and buttery".

See also
Nitro cold brew

References

Sources

Food and drink introduced in 2022
Nitrogen-infused drinks
PepsiCo soft drinks